Mark S. Owens is an American politician. He has served as a Republican member for the 17th district in the North Dakota House of Representatives  since 2011.

References

Politicians from Grand Forks, North Dakota
Politicians from Montgomery, Alabama
Businesspeople from North Dakota
Living people
Republican Party members of the North Dakota House of Representatives
21st-century American politicians
Year of birth missing (living people)